Vaadikkadu  is a village in the  
Aranthangi revenue block of Pudukkottai district,
Tamil Nadu, India.

Demographics 

As per the 2007 census, Vaadikkadu had a total population of 773
 
with 394 males and 374 females.

Demographics Climate

Villages in Pudukkottai district